Liana Forest is a Soviet-born classical pianist and recording artist. She lives in the United States and performs in concerts.

Biography
Born in Odessa, Liana began her music training at the age of three with her father, a tenor at the Odessa Opera. Liana grew up a student of Ludmila Ginsburg, herself a graduate from Moscow Conservatoire under the tutelage of professor Heinrich Neuhaus (Richter and Gilels were among his other pupils). A Bösendorfer artist, she was a featured soloist at the Midsummer Mozart Festival and toured nationwide under the auspices of Columbia Artists Management. She performed in recitals in the US, Africa, Europe and Asia and appeared on National European Television. 
To date, Liana has recorded three CDs: Romantic Piano, Piano Serenade and Christmas Elegance.

References

External links
Liana Forest's website
Liana Forest's profile and video o Moli

Russian classical pianists
Russian women pianists
American classical pianists
American women classical pianists
Russian emigrants to the United States
Living people
Year of birth missing (living people)
21st-century classical pianists
21st-century American women pianists
21st-century American pianists